"Market For Murder" is the fourth episode of the fifth series of Midsomer Murders and the twenty second episode overall. It stars John Nettles as Detective Chief Inspector Tom Barnaby and Daniel Casey as Detective Sergeant Gavin Troy.

Plot

Stock broker Selwyn Proctor is furious when his classic car blows up outside his prestigious home in Midsomer Market. On the other hand, he would be more furious if he discovered that the reading club his wife Tamsin and a group of other ladies from the village are part of is actually a group of middle-aged women investing in the stock market. These include glamorous divorcee, Ginny Sharp, local GP's wife Sandra Bradshaw and Lady Chetwood of Chetwood House on the outskirts of the village. After one meeting when Lady Chetwood and Mrs Proctor announce they'd like to sell their shares, the elderly head of the group is brutally battered to death with her walking stick whilst getting ready for bed that night. D.C.I. Barnaby and D.S. Troy are called in to investigate the mysterious death but don't catch the killer before more deaths occur.

Murders
Throughout the episode, there are 3 murders and one attempted murder:
Marjorie Empson: Multiple blows to the back of her head with her walking stick after she had fallen down a flight of stairs.
Ginny Sharp: Whilst fishing out ashtrays in her swimming pool (that were placed there by the murderer), Ginny is struck dead by an ashtray to the head.
Lady Lavinia Chetwood: The murderer pushes Lady Chetwod off the roof of her Stately home.

References

Midsomer Murders episodes
2002 British television episodes